Amila Glamočak (born 19 July 1966 in Sarajevo, Bosnia and Herzegovina, Yugoslavia) is a Bosnian singer. She participated in the Eurovision Song Contest 1996 with the song "Za našu ljubav" for Bosnia and Herzegovina, finishing 22nd out of 23. She appeared in the Bosnian national final on two other occasions (2001 and 2003) but failed to qualify.
She now lives in Turkey and is remarried.

References

External Links 
Official website 

1966 births
Living people
Musicians from Sarajevo
Bosniaks of Bosnia and Herzegovina
21st-century Bosnia and Herzegovina women singers
Eurovision Song Contest entrants for Bosnia and Herzegovina
Eurovision Song Contest entrants of 1996
Bosnia and Herzegovina emigrants to Turkey
20th-century Bosnia and Herzegovina women singers